Reistad is a surname. Notable people with the surname include:

Henny Reistad (born 1999), Norwegian handball player
Ole Reistad (1898–1949), Norwegian military officer and athlete
 (born 1994), Norwegian cross-country skier

See also
 Reistad